This is a list of flyovers in Lahore.

See also
 Chowk Kumharanwala Level II Flyover
 Yousuf Raza Gillani Flyover
 List of flyovers in Pakistan
 List of flyovers in Lahore

Flyovers in Lahore
Flyovers, Lahore